Dərzili (also, Derzili) is a village in the Jabrayil Rayon of Azerbaijan.

References 

Populated places in Jabrayil District